Johan Nikles (born 23 March 1997) is a Swiss tennis player.

Nikles has a career high ATP singles ranking of World No. 256 achieved on 11 July 2022. He also has a career high ATP doubles ranking of World No. 357 achieved on 3 October 2022.

On the junior tour, Nikles has a career high ITF junior ranking of No. 26 achieved in January 2015.

Career

2016: ATP debut
Nikles made his ATP main draw debut at the 2016 Swiss Open Gstaad, receiving a singles main draw wildcard.

2022: Top 300 debut
He qualified for the 2022 Geneva Open defeating 3rd seed Peter Gojowczyk and 8th seed Lukáš Rosol and won his first ATP singles main draw match against compatriot wildcard Leandro Riedi saving three match balls. He lost to Tallon Griekspoor in the second round. As a result he moved 40 positions up into the top 300.

References

External links

1997 births
Living people
Swiss male tennis players
Tennis players from Geneva